Canadian federal elections have provided the following results in Quebec City.

Regional profile
Quebec City, like the rest of the province, used to be solidly Liberal until 1984.  In 1984 and 1988, the Progressive Conservatives swept the area, thanks to nationalist support.  This nationalist support went to the Bloc Québécois in 1993, and Quebec City became a Bloc stronghold for the next two decades. 

In the 2000 election, the Liberals were able to gain some ground, winning two seats, but the Bloc regained those seats in the 2004 election before losing all but one in 2006 to the Conservatives. The 2006 and 2008 federal elections witnessed fierce battles between sovereigntist support for the Bloc, and populist/libertarian support for the Conservatives, which intensified greatly in the fallout of the CHOI-FM controversy.  

In 2011, the unexpected surge of NDP support in Quebec managed to overwhelm the support of all other parties, allowing them to sweep Quebec City.

The Liberals remained on the radar screen in Quebec City, but this support didn't translate into actual seats again until 2015, when they won two seats. The Conservatives won the other three, among the few bright spots in the Tories' defeat that year. In 2019 the Bloc regain popularity but only one seat leaving two seats each for Liberals and Conservatives.

Votes by party throughout time

2019 - 43rd General Election

2015 - 42nd General Election

2011 - 41st General Election

2008 - 40th General Election
The Bloc Québécois won one of the four seats lost to the Conservatives in the last election.

2006 - 39th General Election
The Bloc Québécois held on to just one of the five seats in this region, losing four to the Conservatives, who had some of their strongest results in Quebec in this region in 2004, mainly from libertarian voters as a result of the CHOI-FM controversy.

2004 - 38th General Election

Maps 

Beauport
Charlesbourg
Louis-Hébert
Louis-Saint-Laurent
Québec

2000 - 37th General Election

1997 - 36th General Election

1993 - 35th General Election

1988 - 34th General Election

1984 - 33rd General Election 

Quebec City
Federal